Mitchell Leonardo Nere (born August 11, 1988) is an Indonesian footballer that currently plays for Persidafon Dafonsoro in the Indonesia Super League.

Pensonal life
He is the son of Indonesia's national team star in the 70's and 80's era Rully Nere is now a head coach for the team PSBS Biak Numfor in the event Liga Indonesia Premier Division.

References

External links

1988 births
Living people
Indonesian footballers
Pelita Jaya FC players
Persidafon Dafonsoro players
PSMS Medan players
Association football midfielders
Sportspeople from Jakarta